Abrahamczyk or Abrahamczik is a Polish surname derived from the given name Abraham. Notable people with the surname include:

Mariola Abrahamczyk (born 1958), Polish rower

Polish-language surnames